Hong Kong competed at the 2013 World Aquatics Championships in Barcelona, Spain between 19 July and 4 August 2013.

Diving

Hong Kong qualified five quota places for the following diving events.

Men

Women

Open water swimming

Hong Kong qualified four quota places for the following events in open water swimming.

Swimming

Hong Kong swimmers earned qualifying standards in the following events (up to a maximum of 2 swimmers in each event at the A-standard entry time, and 1 at the B-standard):

Men

Women

Synchronized swimming

Hong Kong has qualified two synchronized swimmers.

References

External links
Barcelona 2013 Official Site
HKASA web site

Nations at the 2013 World Aquatics Championships
2013 in Hong Kong sport
Hong Kong at the World Aquatics Championships